InterseXion is an art exhibition by artist Robert A. Hamblin. It was shown at the Iziko South African National Gallery in 2018.

References

External links
Robert A. Hamblin’s InterseXion to tour nationally, notice from gallery which first exhibited

2018 in South Africa
Art exhibitions in South Africa
LGBT art